Robert George Hurlburt (born May 1, 1950) is a Canadian former professional ice hockey left winger who played one game in the National Hockey League (NHL) for the Vancouver Canucks, on November 23 1974 against the New York Islanders. Primarily a defensive forward, the rest of his professional career was spent in the minor leagues, split between the American Hockey League, Western Hockey League, and Central Hockey League, in a career that lasted from 1970 until 1975.

Career statistics

Regular season and playoffs

See also
List of players who played only one game in the NHL

External links

1950 births
Canadian ice hockey left wingers
Kitchener Rangers players
Living people
Quebec Aces (AHL) players
Richmond Robins players
San Diego Gulls (WHL) players
Seattle Totems (CHL) players
Ice hockey people from Toronto
Undrafted National Hockey League players
Vancouver Canucks players